Chionea valga, the snow fly, is a species of limoniid crane fly in the family Limoniidae.

References

Limoniidae
Articles created by Qbugbot
Insects described in 1841